In the field of ecology, the relative abundance distribution (RAD) or species abundance distribution describes the relationship between the number of species observed in a field study as a function of their observed abundance. The graphs obtained in this manner are typically fitted to a Zipf–Mandelbrot law, the exponent of which serves as an index of biodiversity in the ecosystem under study.

Notes and references

Ecological metrics